The Newag Vulcano (series DMU 001-004), is a diesel multiple unit railcar, built by Polish manufacturer Newag for the Ferrovia Circumetnea of Catania.

The Vulcano was introduced in December 2013, when Italian railroad Ferrovia Circumetnea ordered four two-car trainsets. The first unit from the order was delivered two years later, and Vulcanos began revenue service in May 2016.  In December 2017, Ferrovia Circumetnea placed an order for four more trainsets, three of which were contingent on obtaining financing.

The Vulcano is based on a design from bankrupt Italian manufacturer Costa Sistemi Ferroviari.

References

 

Diesel railcars and multiple units of Italy